Oneida is a city in Madison County in the U.S. state of New York. It is located west of Oneida Castle (in Oneida County) and east of Wampsville. The population was 11,390 at the 2010 census. The city, like both Oneida County and the nearby silver and china maker, was named for the Oneida tribe, which had a large territory here around Oneida Lake during the colonial period.

History

This area was part of the territory of the Oneida tribe during the colonial era. The Oneida were one of the original Five Nations of the Iroquois League and many Oneida were allies of the Americans during the Revolutionary War, although the Onondaga, Cayuga, Seneca and Mohawk tribes led by Mohawk Chief Joseph Brant, who fought for the British out of Niagara, decimated several isolated American settlements. Returning to their homes after the Revolution, the Oneida men who served and supported the American effort were compensated by the U.S. government for their losses and took in remnants of the Mohegan nation.

The federally recognized Oneida Nation owns land in this vicinity, where some members live. It operates the Turning Stone Casino and Resort in Verona. It is one of four recognized tribes of Oneida people, the only one in the state.

In the post-Revolutionary period, central and western New York were settled by many migrants from New England. With development of the Erie Canal in the early 19th century, the movement of people expanded towards the Midwest as trade and commerce increased. Oneida's development began to pick up as new trade routes were opened, especially in the period initially following construction of the Oneida Lake canal and feeder and an associated railroad stop, tying it into major trade networks of the day.

The Village of Oneida was incorporated on June 20, 1848 as part of the larger Town of Lenox to its west, but years of friction among the different sections of town spurred this village to establish itself independently as the new Town of Oneida in 1896. In turn, this town was later chartered as the City of Oneida on March 28, 1901. Because of its history, the center part of the city has a compact design and is a pedestrian friendly community today.

Geography
Oneida is located at  (43.084961, -75.653375). The city is located between Syracuse and Utica.

Oneida is centrally located among Montreal, Toronto, Buffalo, Boston, and New York City. It is west of the Adirondack Mountains. It is located just southeast of Oneida Lake, the largest lake entirely within New York.

Urban planning

The city of Oneida is a good example of pre-World War II city design. It was designed at a pedestrian scale, making it compact and bicycle-friendly for today's residents. Public buildings, parks, and private residences are located in proximity, within walking and biking distance. The city is popular with remote workers who can choose where they live without the constraints of job location. Most residents of the city core are within walking distance to elementary schools and church activities.

Since the late 20th century, interest has renewed for increased bicycle infrastructure. Efforts are being made to revitalize the disused light-rail pathways, which ring the city's south and north side, for multiple uses by cyclists and for recreation, and as a gateway to and from the inner and outer area retail districts. 

Starting in the 2010s, Oneida has seen a revitalization to its downtown core.  The formation of the Oneida City Center Committee has been the catalyst of this effort.  They have partnered with outside institutions and partners such as Syracuse University's School of Architecture and engineering consultants to create a vision for the downtown's streetscape and buildings.  The Greater Oneida Chamber of Commerce also works with the committee and the city to encourage and facilitate business growth in the city core.  Through this collaboration, many new businesses have emerged in recent years.    In addition, the Oneida City Center Market was established in 2018 and hosted various local business to table at their weekly summer event.  The city and downtown committees hope for a more aggressive push for revitalization in the coming years and are looking for outside sources of funding to make that a possibility.

Oneida benefits from having several postsecondary academies within commuting distance, including Colgate University, Hamilton College, the State University of New York Institute of Technology, Syracuse University, Le Moyne College, Mohawk Valley Community College, Cazenovia College, the State University of New York at Morrisville, and Utica College.

Recreational waterways such as the Erie Canal and Oneida Creek are located on the perimeter of the city limits. City parks are distributed throughout the city, with the exception of the rural Mount Hope Reservoir park. Also available are fishing, hiking, mountain biking, cross-country skiing, and a winter ice skating rink.

The Main-Broad-Grove Streets area was designated as a National Historic District in 1983. The Oneida Community Mansion House is highlighted on the Madison County Architectural Heritage Trail.

Demographics

As of the census of 2010,  11,393 people, 4,672 households, and 2,814 families were residing in the city. The population density was 500 people per square mile (192.6/km2).

Some 4,672 housing units were within the city limits. The racial makeup of the city was 96.29% White, 0.80% African American, 1.39% Native American, 0.46% Asian,  0.20% from other races, and 0.86% from two or more races. Hispanics or Latinos of any race were 0.84% of the population.

Of the 4,431 households 32.1% had children under 18 living with them, 45.3% were married couples living together, 11.9% had a female householder with no husband present, and 38.5% were not families. About 32.0% of all households were made up of individuals, and 13.5% had someone living alone who was 65 or older. The average household size was 2.40, and the average family size was 3.03.

In the city, the age distribution was 25.1% under 18, 7.9% from 18 to 24, 29.9% from 25 to 44, 22.1% from 45 to 64, and 15.0% who were 65 or older. The median age was 37 years. For every 100 females there were 92.5 males. For every 100 females 18 and over, there were 88.7 males.

The median income for a household in the city was $35,365, and for a family was $45,242. Males had a median income of $31,244 versus $23,846 for females. The per capita income for the city was $18,966. About 8.8% of families and 12.5% of the population were below the poverty line, including 11.5% of those under age 18 and 10.6% of those 65 or over.

Education 
The public Oneida City School District operates in Oneida, the city of Oneida Castle, the hamlet of Durhamville, the village of Wampsville, and certain parts of Canastota.

Oneida benefits from having several postsecondary academies within commuting distance including Colgate University, Hamilton College, the State University of New York Institute of Technology, Syracuse University, Le Moyne College, Mohawk Valley Community College, Cazenovia College, the State University of New York at Morrisville, and Utica College.

Communities and locations 
Bennetts Corners – A hamlet in the southeastern part of the city, located at the intersection of Peterboro and Middle Roads.
Oneida Community – A former religious commune. The Oneida Community Mansion House is located at Kenwood Avenue and Skinner Road.

Government
The city government consists of a mayor who is elected at large and six council members, each elected from one of six wards.

Other facts 
Oneida is located near the site of the former Oneida Community, a social and religious experiment that flourished during the third quarter of the 19th century. The Oneida Community Mansion House, a national historic monument, is the principal building of the Oneida Community.  International tableware company Oneida Limited, founded 1880, is still headquartered in the city, although all US manufacturing operations have now ceased and all Oneida products are imported. 

Oneida is also the home of Cross Island Chapel, built in 1989 and situated in the middle of a pond, which is believed by many to be the world's smallest church.

Oneida was formerly known as Oneida Depot. In the 19th century, its residents were among the closest neighbors to a utopian socialist commune, set up by John Humphrey Noyes, lasting from 1848 until 1881. This commune, called the Oneida Community, produced silk and canned goods until the manufacturing of flatware picked up in the later years of the community's existence. This  led to the foundation of Oneida Limited, a company that outlasted the community and became one of America's most important flatware producers in the 20th century.

Oneida was featured in the storyline of the television show Law & Order (episode 250 - "Brother's Keeper"), in which an Irish-American Mafia informant for the FBI takes refuge at the Oneida home of his twin brother, who is a teacher at a local university.

Joan Blondell's character, Vida Fleet, in the 1932 movie Big City Blues is from Oneida.

Oneida has a number of properties on the National Register of Historic Places, including the Main-Broad-Grove Streets Historic District, Cottage Lawn, DeFerriere House, Mount Hope Reservoir, Oneida Armory, Oneida Community Mansion House, and United States Post Office.

Notable residents
 Riley Dixon, NFL punter
 James Howe, author of the Bunnicula book series
 John Humphrey Noyes, founder of a perfectionist communal society in Oneida, New York, in 1848
 Alfred Marcy, recipient of the Legion of Merit
 Ted Phillips, president and CEO of the Chicago Bears
 Joanne Shenandoah, Gammy-winning Native American musician
 Com Truise, electronic musician

See also
Oneida people
Samuel de Champlain
Joanne Shenandoah

References

External links

 City of Oneida, NY
 The Utopia of Sharing in Oneida, N.Y.

 
Cities in New York (state)
Syracuse metropolitan area
Company towns in New York (state)
Cities in Madison County, New York
Populated places established in 1901